Åstrand is a Nordic surname that may refer to
Christina Åstrand (born 1969), Danish violinist
Jonathan Åstrand (born 1985), Finnish sprinter
Per-Olof Åstrand (1922–2015), Swedish physiologist
Åstrand test, a way of measuring VO2 max (maximum rate of oxygen consumption during incremental exercise)